Pomacea comissionis is a species of freshwater snail in the family Ampullariidae. It was first described by Hermann von Ihering in 1898 as a variety (i.e., subspecies) of Ampullaria decussata.

References 

commissionis
Gastropods described in 1898
Taxa named by Hermann von Ihering
Freshwater snails